Operation Toan Thang may refer to:

Operation Toan Thang I, a U.S. Army, Army of the Republic of Vietnam (ARVN), 1st Australian Task Force and Royal Thai Volunteer Regiment operation during the Vietnam War in III Corps conducted from 8 April to 31 May 1968 
Operation Toan Thang II, allied operation in III Corps from 1 June 1968 to 16 February 1969
Operation Toan Thang III, allied operation in III Corps from 17 February and 31 October 1969
Campaign Toan Thang, a People's Army of Vietnam wet season offensive of the Laotian Civil War from 18 to 27 June 1969
Operation Toan Thang IV, allied operation in III Corps from 1 November 1969 to 1 May 1970
Operation Toan Thang 41, an ARVN operation during the Cambodian Campaign in the Angel's Wing area from 14 to 17 April 1970
Operation Toan Thang 42, an ARVN operation during the Cambodian Campaign in the Parrot's Beak area from 30 April to 29 June 1970
Operation Toan Thang 43-6, an ARVN operation during the Cambodian Campaign in the Fishhook area from 1 May to 30 June 1970
Operation Toan Thang 44, U.S. 1st Brigade, 25th Infantry Division operation during the Cambodian Campaign from 6 to 14 May 1970
Operation Toan Thang 45, U.S. 1st Cavalry Division operation during the Cambodian Campaign from 6 May to 30 June 1970
Operation Toan Thang 46, an ARVN operation during the Cambodian Campaign from 6 May to 30 June 1970